This is a list of musicians that are notable for their harmonica playing skills.

Harmonica bands/groups
Borrah Minevitch and his Harmonica Rascals
Morton Fraser's Harmonica Gang
The Harmonica Gentlemen
Jerry Murad's Harmonicats
Johnny Puleo's Harmonica Gang
King's College Harmonica Band
Sväng
The Three Monarchs

Blues

Adam Gussow (Satan and Adam)
Alan Glen
Annie Raines
Alan Wilson (Canned Heat)
Big Mama Thornton
Big Walter Horton
Bill Dicey
Billy Bizor
Billy Boy Arnold
Billy Branch
Billy Gibson
Blind Mississippi Morris
Bob Corritore
Bonny B.
Captain Beefheart
Carey Bell
Carlos del Junco
Charlie Musselwhite
Charlie Sayles
Chris Wilson
Corky Siegel
Curtis Salgado
Cyril Davies
Charly Chiarelli
Dan Aykroyd (as Elwood Blues)
Delbert McClinton
Dennis Gruenling
Don Partridge
Dutch Mason
Eddie "Guitar" Burns
Fabio Treves
Garrett Dutton
Gary Primich
George "Harmonica" Smith
George "Mojo" Buford
George Higgs
Golden "Big" Wheeler
Good Rockin' Charles
Greg "Fingers" Taylor
Hammie Nixon
Harmonica Fats
Harmonica Frank
Harmonica Shah
Howlin' Wolf
Huey Lewis (Huey Lewis and the News)
Igor Flach
J. D. Wilkes
J.D. Short
James Cotton
James Harman
James Montgomery
Jason Ricci
Jazz Gillum
Jean-Jacques Milteau
Jerry McCain
Jerry Portnoy
Jim Belushi (also as Brother Zee Blues)
Jim Conway (Australian)
Jimmy Reed
Joe Dolce
Joe Filisko
John "Juke" Logan
John Mayall (Bluesbreakers)
John Mayer
John Németh
John Popper (Blues Traveler)
Johnny Dyer
Johnny Sansone
Junior Wells
Kim Wilson (formerly of The Fabulous Thunderbirds)
Lazy Lester
Les Stroud
Lester Butler
Little Mack Simmons
Little Sammy Davis
Little Sonny
Little Walter
Lynwood Slim
Mark Hummel (The Blues Survivors)
Mark Wenner (The Nighthawks)
Marla Glen
Matt Taylor
Moses "Whispering" Smith
Noah Lewis
Norton Buffalo
Paul Butterfield
Paul deLay
Paul Jones
Paul Lamb
Paul Oscher (Muddy Waters Band)
Pete Hampton
Peter Madcat Ruth
Phil Wiggins
Philip Achille
Pierre Lacocque
Powell St. John
Rob Hoeke
Rob Paparozzi
Rob Stone
Rod Piazza
Sam Myers
Shakey Jake Harris
Slim Harpo
Snooky Pryor
Sonny Boy Williamson I (a.k.a. John Lee Williamson)
Sonny Boy Williamson II (a.k.a. Aleck Ford "Rice" Miller)
Sonny Terry
Steven Tyler (Aerosmith)
Sugar Blue
Sugar Ray Norcia
Suzanne Link
Tad Robinson
Taj Mahal
Taylor Hicks
Thom Doucette
Tony "Little Sun" Glover
Walkin' Cane Mark
Bill "Watermelon Slim" Homans
Will Shade
William Clarke

Bluegrass
 Willie P. Bennett
 Mike Stevens

Folk

 Bobby Darin
 Hugo Díaz
 Jay Diggins
 Donovan
 Bob Dylan
 Ramblin' Jack Elliott
 Steve Forbert
 Jesse Fuller
 León Gieco
 Laura Jane Grace
 Dallas Green
 Arlo Guthrie
 Woody Guthrie
 Sam Hinton
 Jenny Lewis
 Mel Lyman
 Rory McLeod
 Tom Morello (The Nightwatchman)
 Chuck Ragan
 Ketch Secor (Old Crow Medicine Show)
 Sonny Terry
 Vikki Thorn (The Waifs)
 Neil Young

Rock

Adam Lazzara (Taking Back Sunday)
Al Stewart
Alan Wilson (Canned Heat)
Alanis Morissette
Andrew Farriss (INXS)
Andrew McMahon
Andy Williams
Anton Newcombe (The Brian Jonestown Massacre)
Arthur Lee (Love)
Benny Gallagher (Gallagher and Lyle)
Bertrand Cantat (Noir Désir)
Billie Joe Armstrong (Green Day)
Billy Joel
Billy Lee Riley
Bob Dylan
Bono (U2)
Brian Greenway (April Wine, Mashmakhan)
Brian Jones (The Rolling Stones)
Brian Molko (Placebo)
Broderick Smith
Bruce Springsteen
Bryan Adams
Burton Cummings
Chris Lowell
Chris Martin (Coldplay)
Chris Robinson (The Black Crowes)
Chris Squire (Yes)
Chrissie Hynde (The Pretenders)
Christofer Drew (Never Shout Never)
Christopher Wolstenholme (Muse)
Claudio Sanchez (Coheed and Cambria)
Cody Canada (Cross Canadian Ragweed, The Departed)
Dave Gage
Dave Gahan (Depeche Mode)
Dave Mason (Traffic)
David Bowie
David Gilmour (Pink Floyd)
David Lee Roth
Eddie Vedder (Pearl Jam)
Enrique Bunbury (Héroes del Silencio)
G. Love
Gary Brooker (Procol Harum)
Gem Archer (Oasis)
Gene Clark (The Byrds)
Gene Cornish (The Rascals, Fotomaker)
Greg Lake (Emerson, Lake and Palmer) Paper Blood on the Black Moon album.
Hope Sandoval (Mazzy Star)
Huey Lewis (Huey Lewis and the News)
Humberto Gessinger (Engenheiros do Hawaii)
Ian Anderson (Jethro Tull)
Ian Gillan (Deep Purple)
Jack Bruce
James Taylor
Joe Satriani
John Fogerty (Creedence Clearwater Revival)
John Kay (Steppenwolf)
John Lennon (Beatles)
John Mellencamp
John Popper (Blues Traveler)
John Sebastian (The Lovin' Spoonful)
Johnny Marr
Jon Bon Jovi
Jon Foreman (Switchfoot)
Jonny Greenwood (Radiohead)
Keith Relf
Kelly Hoppe (Big Sugar)
Lee Brilleaux (Dr. Feelgood)
Lee Oskar (War)
Lemmy (Motörhead)
Levon Helm (The Band)
Magic Dick (The J. Geils Band)
Matt Mays
Melissa Etheridge
Mick Jagger
Nancy Wilson (Heart)
Neil Young
Ozzy Osbourne (Black Sabbath)
Pete Yorn
Peter Garrett (Midnight Oil)
Pete Stahl (Goatsnake)
Philip Achille
PJ Harvey
Ray Collins (The Mothers of Invention)
Ray Davies (The Kinks)
Ray Dorset (Mungo Jerry)
Ray Jackson (Lindisfarne)
Ray Thomas (The Moody Blues)
Richard Manuel (The Band)
Rick Danko (The Band)
Rick Davies (Supertramp)
Rivers Cuomo (Weezer)
Rob Paparozzi
Robbie Robertson (The Band)
Robert Plant (Led Zeppelin)
Robert Smith (The Cure)
Rod Stewart
Roger Daltrey (The Who)
Ron McKernan (Grateful Dead)
Ronnie Wood (Faces, The Rolling Stones)
Rory Gallagher
Ryan Adams 
Scott Thurston (Tom Petty and the Heartbreakers)
Selena Gomez
Shakira
Shannon Hoon (Blind Melon)
Sheryl Crow
Southside Johnny
Steve Marriott (Small Faces, Humble Pie)
Steven Tyler (Aerosmith)
Stevie Wonder
Sully Erna (Godsmack)
Susanna Hoffs (The Bangles)
Teddy Andreadis
Tim Armstrong (Rancid)
Tom Fogerty (Creedence Clearwater Revival)
Tom Petty
Van Morrison
Warren Zevon

Country music
 Philip Achille
 Ryan Adams
 DeFord Bailey
 Humphrey Bate
 Ryan Bingham
 Clint Black
 Steve Earle
 Evan Felker (Turnpike Troubadours)
 Buddy Greene
 Chris Janson
 Ryan Koenig
 Kris Kristofferson
 Martina McBride
 Parker McCollum
 Charlie McCoy
 Terry McMillan
 Heidi Newfield
 Mickey Raphael
 Bobbejaan Schoepen
 Neil Young

Irish music
 Bobby Clancy (The Clancy Brothers)
 Patrick Clancy (The Clancy Brothers)
 James Conway (United States)
 Andy Irvine
 Brendan Power

Jazz
Rob Paparozzi
Philip Achille
Larry Adler
Sébastien Charlier
Max Geldray
Filip Jers
Carlos del Junco
Charles Leighton
Howard Levy
Grégoire Maret
Chris Michalek
Stefano Olivato
Tollak Ollestad
Lee Oskar
Jason Rosenblatt
Toots Thielemans
Stevie Wonder
Frédéric Yonnet

Classical music
 Philip Achille
 Jerry Adler
 Larry Adler
 Robert Bonfiglio
 Willi Burger
 Angelo Dos Santos
 Sigmund Groven
 Stan Harper
 Tommy Reilly
 John Sebastian, Sr.

Tango
 Hugo Diaz
 Joe Powers

Hip hop
 Bad News Brown

Afrobeat
 D'banj

References

 
Harmonica